Pearl River High School can refer to:
Pearl River High School (Louisiana)
Pearl River High School (New York)

See also
 Pearl River (disambiguation)